Campodea californiensis is a species of two-pronged bristletail in the family Campodeidae.

Subspecies
These two subspecies belong to the species Campodea californiensis:
 Campodea californiensis californiensis Hilton, 1932 i c g
 Campodea californiensis nordica Silvestri, 1933 i c g
Data sources: i = ITIS, c = Catalogue of Life, g = GBIF, b = Bugguide.net

References

Further reading

 
 
 
 
 
 
 
 

Diplura
Animals described in 1932